Acacia anfractuosa is a shrub or tree of the genus Acacia and the subgenus Plurinerves that is endemic to Western Australia.

Description
The pendulous, flexuose and glabrous branchlets have resinous new shoots. The green to grey-green, linear phyllodes are widely and strongly incurved. It blooms from July to December and produces yellow flowers. The simple inflorescences occur singly or in pairs in the axils. The linear, curved, dark brown seed pods with yellow margins form after flowering.

Taxonomy
The species was first formally described by the botanist Bruce Maslin in 1976 as part of the work Studies in the genus Acacia (Mimosaceae) - Miscellaneous new phyllodinous species as published in the journal Nuytsia. It was reclassified as Racosperma anfractuosum by Leslie Pedley in 2003  and then transferred back to the genus Acacia in 2006.
It is quite closely related to Acacia sciophanes and also similar in appearance to Acacia heteroneura and Acacia merinthophora.

Distribution
The shrub native to an area in the Wheatbelt and Goldfields-Esperance regions of Western Australia and is found between Bruce Rock in the west to Coolgardie in the east. It is found on sandplains growing as a part of heath or scrubland communities in sandy soils.

See also
 List of Acacia species

References

anfractuosa
Acacias of Western Australia
Plants described in 1976
Taxa named by Bruce Maslin